Edwand is a hamlet in central Alberta, Canada within Smoky Lake County.

Edward Anderson, an early postmaster, coined the name after his own.

Demographics 
Edwand recorded a population of 2 in the 1986 Census of Population conducted by Statistics Canada.

See also 
List of communities in Alberta
List of hamlets in Alberta

References 

Hamlets in Alberta
Smoky Lake County